is a 1956 black-and-white Japanese film directed by Kenjiro Morinaga.

It is a sport film about sumo wrestler Wakanohana Kanji I. He was nicknamed "Devil of the dohyo"" due to his great fighting spirit and endurance.

Cast
 Wakanohana Kanji I as himself
 and others

References

External links
Wakanohana monogatari dohyou no oni (1992 film)

Sumo films
Japanese black-and-white films
1956 films
Nikkatsu films
Japanese sports films
1950s Japanese films
1950s sports films